A by-election was held for the Sarawak State Assembly seat of Tanjong Datu on 18 February 2017 following the nomination day on 4 February 2017. The seat fell vacant following the death of its state assemblyman and Sarawak Chief Minister Adenan Satem from cardiac arrest on January 11, 2017. Adenan, who was also president of the Parti Pesaka Bumiputera Bersatu (a Barisan Nasional component party), won the Tanjong Datu seat in 2016 state elections when he defeated Jazolkipli Numan of PKR by polling 6,360 votes against 468 by Jazolkipli.

The Tanjong Datu by-election will see a three-way contest between Barisan Nasional candidate Jamilah Anu, State Reform Party candidate Johnny Aput and Parti Bansa Dayak Sarawak Baru candidate Rapelson Richard Hamit. Jamilah is the widow of Adenan and has been known for her involvement in charity and volunteer work and accompanying her late husband on constituency visits.

Results 
Jamilah Anu managed to retain the seat for Barisan Nasional with a majority of 6,443 votes beating two other candidates.

References 

2017 elections in Malaysia
Elections in Sarawak
2017
February 2017 events in Malaysia